Rita Gildemeister (born 6 March 1947) is a German athlete. She competed in the women's high jump at the 1972 Summer Olympics, representing East Germany. She became East German champion in 1965, and also won two silver and two bronze between 1967 and 1971. At the East German indoor championships she won four silver medals between 1965 and 1973. She competed for the sports club SC Leipzig.

References

External links
 

1947 births
Living people
People from Güstrow
East German female high jumpers
Sportspeople from Mecklenburg-Western Pomerania
Olympic athletes of East Germany
Athletes (track and field) at the 1972 Summer Olympics
SC Leipzig athletes